A list of films produced in Morocco in 1981.

1981

References

External links 

 Moroccan films of 1981 at the Internet Movie Database

1981
Moroccan
Films